Khalsha (also Romanized as Khalshā, Khalsha’, and Kholashā) is a village in Chahardeh Rural District, in the Central District of Astaneh-ye Ashrafiyeh County, Gilan Province, Iran. At the 2006 census, its population was 154, in 48 families.

References 

Populated places in Astaneh-ye Ashrafiyeh County